Israa Hamwiah (born 11 February 1991 in Homs) is a Syrian footballer who currently plays for Aali.

References

External links
 
 Profile at Goal.com

Living people
1991 births
Syrian footballers
Association football defenders
Expatriate footballers in Jordan
Expatriate footballers in Kuwait
Al-Karamah players
Al-Sheikh Hussein FC players
Qadsia SC players
Sportspeople from Homs
Syrian expatriate footballers
Syrian expatriate sportspeople in Jordan
Syrian expatriate sportspeople in Kuwait
Malkiya Club players
Syria international footballers
Syrian Premier League players
Expatriate footballers in Lebanon
Syrian expatriate sportspeople in Lebanon
Salam Zgharta FC players
Lebanese Premier League players
Kuwait Premier League players
Syrian expatriate sportspeople in Bahrain
Expatriate footballers in Bahrain
Bahraini Premier League players
Al Hala SC players
Manama Club players
Hidd SCC players